Edmonds Field was home to the Sacramento Solons, the Pacific Coast League AAA team until 1960 when they moved to Hawaii. On April 12, 1964, prior to it being demolished to make way for a Gemco discount store, the last baseball game played there was an exhibition game between the San Francisco Giants and the Cleveland Indians.  That game featured back-to-back home runs by Willie Mays and Willie McCovey, both hit over the towering walls in right center field.

The field was located at the southeast corner of Broadway and Riverside Boulevard.  A Target Store currently occupies the footprint of the former field and there is a plaque in the parking lot where home plate used to sit.

References
Baseball Hall of Fame inductee, Joe Gordon, was once the Solon's Manager and Charlie Graham - was once the General Manager/Vice Presidenthttp://www.baseballpilgrimages.com/AAA/sacramento.html

Defunct baseball venues in the United States
Demolished sports venues in California
Baseball venues in California